Route 112 is a  rural state highway through western Franklin and Hampshire Counties. It begins at U.S. Route 20 (US 20) in Huntington and ends at the Vermont state line in Colrain, where it continues as Vermont Route 112.

Route description
Route 112 begins in Huntington at U.S. Route 20, near the junction of the branches of the Westfield River.  It heads north from the downtown area, immediately crossing the West Branch and closely following the Middle Branch until it and the North Branch split, at which point it continues to follow the North Branch.  In the village of Knightville, Route 112 meets the western end of Route 66, which leads to Northampton.  The route continues northward through town, passing the Knightville State Wildlife Management Area and the Hiram H. Fox State Wildlife Management Area before entering the town of Worthington.

In Worthington, Route 112 heads through the center of town until it meets Route 143 for a mile-long concurrency, splitting to the north and heading to Cummington.  In Cummington, Route 112 turns eastward abruptly at Five Corners before meeting Route 9 near the North Branch once again.  The two routes pass concurrently along the river through the center of town before heading into Goshen, finally splitting near the Lower Highland Lake, where Route 112 turns northwards towards Ashfield.  In Ashfield, Route 116 shares the route for over a mile before that route turns eastward towards the town center.  

Route 112 continues northward into the town of Buckland.  The route bends to the northeast before looping over and meeting Route 2 (the Mohawk Trail) in the village of Shelburne Falls.  The route passes concurrently with Route 2 over the Deerfield River into the town of Shelburne.  In Shelburne, Route 112 splits from Route 2, turning around Mechanic and Hope Streets onto Main Street, where it turns northward and crosses under Route 2 once again.  From there, Route 112 follows the North River into the town of Colrain.  The route runs along the river's side, crossing it in the village of Griswoldville and again in the center of the town and in the far northern end of town, before meeting the Vermont town line and continuing into Halifax as Vermont Route 112.

History 
In 1930, the route between Worthington and Cummington lay to the east of the current route.  Also, Route 112 departed Route 9 in the Lithia section of Cummington, traveling north to Route 116 and then following the current route from Ashfield to Shelburne. At that time, the road ended at the junction with Route 2.  The route was extended to Vermont, along what was previously Route 56, in 1939, with Route 56 subsequently re-used elsewhere.  The section between Worthington and Cummington was also moved to the current route during this time period.  Between 1966 and 1969, an existing road between Goshen and Route 116 was upgraded to a highway and Route 112 was rerouted there.

Major intersections

References

External links

112